"What's the Difference" is a song by American rapper Dr. Dre from his second studio album 2001 (1999). It features American rappers Eminem and Xzibit, as well as additional vocals from Phish, and was produced by Dre and Mel-Man.

Composition
The song contains a horn section in the instrumental, as well as a sample of "Parce Que Tu Crois" by Charles Aznavour. Lyrically, the rappers talk about the differences between themselves and other rappers. Dr. Dre reflects on two of his friends, Ice Cube and Eazy-E in his verse. Eminem's verse sees him considering the hypothetical situation of killing his girlfriend Kim, rapping that he would put sunglasses on her corpse and drive around with her in the front seat. He also defends Dre's legacy, threatening those who doubt him.

Critical reception
Roger Morton of NME praised Eminem's feature, describing him as "cutting through particularly effectively" on the track. Frank Williams of The Source called the song the highlight of 2001. Jackson Howard of The Ringer also praised Eminem's verse, which he described as "mesmerizing, equal parts performance art, battle rap, storytelling, and raw charisma".

Charts

Certifications

References

1999 songs
Dr. Dre songs
Eminem songs
Xzibit songs
Songs written by Dr. Dre
Songs written by Eminem
Songs written by Xzibit
Song recordings produced by Dr. Dre
Song recordings produced by Mel-Man
Songs written by Charles Aznavour